Kayashkan (Kayaşkan) is a rural locality (a selo) in Turochaksky District, the Altai Republic, Russia. The population was 138 as of 2016. There are 3 streets.

Geography 
Kayashkan is located 26 km northeast of Turochak (the district's administrative centre) by road. Turochak is the nearest rural locality.

References 

Rural localities in Turochaksky District